Tengeliönjoki is a river of Finland. It is a tributary of the Torne in Finnish Lapland.

See also
List of rivers in Finland

Rivers of Finland
Torne river basin